Lank is a surname. Notable people with the surname include:

 Edith Lank (1926–2023), American author, advice columnist, and blogger
 Jeff Lank (born 1975), Canadian ice hockey player
 Mackenzie Lank (born 1994), American curler
 Patti Lank (born 1964), American curler